2000, Seen By... was a 1998 international film project initiated by the French company Haut et Court to produce films depicting the approaching turn of the millennium seen from the perspectives of 10 different countries.  

The idea was conceived by producers Caroline Benjo and Carole Scotta, who took the idea to Pierre Chevalier of the French-German TV station Arte. They envisioned each film to be one hour long, made for the cost of four to five million francs, by promising directors.

Ten films were produced as a result of the project:

References

Film series introduced in 1998
Fiction set in 2000
Film series